Karmic Mahjong is a 2006 Chinese comedy film directed by Wang Guangli. It stars Francis Ng as a mechanic from Chengdu plagued by bad luck and Cherrie Ying as a young woman who appears to share the same affliction. The film also features cameos by the prominent Chinese directors Wang Xiaoshuai and Jia Zhangke.

The film, a mainland production of the Shanghai Dachong Cultural Information Company and the Zhangzhou Xinchuang Cultural Information Company, nevertheless is director Wang Guangli's homage to the Hong Kong tradition of action-comedies.

Cast
 Francis Ng - Wu Yu-Chuan, a down-on-his luck mechanic living in Sichuan. 
 Cherrie Ying - Jia, a mother who seems to share Wu's bad luck. 
 Na Wai - Yin, a mobster and Wu's childhood friend.
 Paul Chun - Qin, Yin's mobster boss.
 Liu Yiwei - Master Liu as a blind fortune teller.
 Liang Jing - Lai, Wu's wife. 
 Jia Zhangke - a mobster.
 Wang Xiaoshuai - a cop.

Notes

External links

Karmic Mahjong at the Chinese Movie Database

2006 films
2000s comedy thriller films
Chinese comedy films
2000s Mandarin-language films
Sichuanese-language films
Films set in Chengdu
2006 comedy films